Pucioasa is a town in Dâmbovița County, Muntenia, Romania. It administers six villages: Bela, Diaconești, Glodeni, Malurile, Miculești and Pucioasa-Sat.

History

The name of the town dates from 20 September 1649, when it was mentioned in a document as "Piatra Pucioasă" (meaning Brimstone, referring to the sulphur resources nearby).

Natives
 Alexandru Bădoiu
 Cristian Bălașa
 Romulus Ciobanu
 Florentin Rădulescu

References

Towns in Romania
Populated places in Dâmbovița County
Localities in Muntenia